KCFT-CD, virtual and UHF digital channel 35, is a low-powered, Class A TCC-affiliated television station licensed to Anchorage, Alaska, United States. The station is owned by Alaska Broadcast Television, Inc. The station receives support from viewers, programs, commercial sales, and foundations. KCFT depends on several satellite networks for program distribution.

External links
Station website

Religious television stations in the United States
CFT-CD
Low-power television stations in the United States
Television channels and stations established in 1984